Ollaphon is a genus of sea snails, marine gastropod mollusks in the family Fasciolariidae, the spindle snails, the tulip snails and their allies.

The family allocation of Ollaphon is uncertain; this genus is sometimes placed in the family Muricidae.

Species
Species within the genus Ollaphon include:
 Ollaphon molorthus (Hedley & May, 1908)

References

Fasciolariidae
Monotypic gastropod genera